WVIN-FM (98.3 FM) is a radio station broadcasting an adult contemporary format. Licensed to Bath, New York, United States, the station serves the Elmira-Corning area. The station is owned by Gordon Ichikawa, through licensee Tower Broadcasting, LLC, and features programming from ABC Radio  and Westwood One.

History
The station first signed on the air on October 10, 1971, as WEKT-FM with a power of 1.7 kW and was licensed to Hammondsport, New York. The station was owned by Taylor Aviation with offices on Bully Hill in Hammondsport.

In October 1974, the station was sold to Genkar, Inc., which also purchased WGHT in Bath, New York from Taylor Aviation. The studios of the two stations were consolidated in Bath, New York and the station began simulcasting with the call letters WVIN-FM & AM in 1975.
 
The combined stations were sold to Media Magic, Inc. in 1985.  After less than four years of operation, Media Magic declared bankruptcy in February 1989  and the stations operated under bankruptcy protection until sale to Pembrook Pines Mass Media in May 1990. Pembrook Pines operated radio stations throughout New York, including Elmira and Newark.

By 1987, the license city for WVIN-FM had been changed to Bath, New York.

Past DJs
William Bilancio
John Snyder
John Lyke
Steve Rouse

References

External links

VIN-FM